Alexander Littlejohn (1860 – 25 May 1910) was a New Zealand cricketer. He played in two first-class matches for Wellington from 1887 to 1890.

See also
 List of Wellington representative cricketers

References

External links
 

1860 births
1910 deaths
New Zealand cricketers
Wellington cricketers